Rhopobota grisona is a species of moth of the family Tortricidae first described by Józef Razowski in 2013. It is found on Seram Island in Indonesia. The habitat consists of bamboo and secondary forests.

The wingspan is about 15 mm. The forewings are greyish, mixed with brownish in the costal half and basal area. The hindwings are brownish grey.

Etymology
The specific name refers to the colouration of the species and is derived from Latin griseus (meaning grey).

References

Moths described in 2013
Eucosmini